= Beaded septum sign =

Radiologic sign in lung

Beaded septum sign is a radiologic sign seen on chest computed tomography (CT). It is characterized by irregular, nodular thickening of the interlobular septa, giving them a “beaded” or “string-of-pearls” appearance.

The sign is classically associated with pulmonary lymphangitic carcinomatosis, but may also be encountered in other malignant and non-malignant conditions affecting the pulmonary lymphatics.
